The Secretary of the Department of the Prime Minister and Cabinet is the public service head of Australia's Department of the Prime Minister and Cabinet and the most senior public servant in the administration of Government in Australia.

The Secretary of the Department of the Prime Minister and Cabinet should not be confused with the Cabinet Secretary, a ministerial position within the Department of the Prime Minister and Cabinet portfolio responsible for assisting the Prime Minister in the procedural and operational matters of the Cabinet of Australia.

The Secretary of the DPMC is Australia’s highest-paid bureaucrat, earning more than $914,000, as of 2019.

List of Secretaries of the Department of the Prime Minister and Cabinet
Below is the list of Secretaries, since the first appointment was made on 1 January 1912.

Notes
 Sir Alan Carmody  died suddenly of coronary vascular disease on 12 April 1978; during the term of his appointment.

Historical arrangements
Within days of John Gorton becoming Prime Minister, the functions of the Prime Minister's Department was split and a Department of the Cabinet Office was established. On taking office as Prime Minister in 1971, William McMahon reversed Gorton's changes and restored earlier changes via the creation of the Department of the Prime Minister and Cabinet. A lesser role of Secretary to the Department of the Vice-President of the Executive Council was established for a short time; abolished in the early days of the Whitlam government. Upon election to office in 1996, John Howard established a separate Cabinet Office within the Department of the Prime Minister and Cabinet. The Cabinet Office was a small unit, staffed from within and outside the public service, which provided the Prime Minister with advice on issues before Cabinet as well as strategic policy directions.

Secretary to the Department of the Cabinet Office

Secretary to the Department of the Vice-President of the Executive Council

References

Department of the Prime Minister (Australia)